Brave New Land is a 2000 Brazilian drama film written and directed by Lúcia Murat. The title comes from a line from the chorus refrain written by journalist Evaristo da Veiga for the Brazilian Independence Anthem. It depicts the conflicted relationship between Portuguese, Spanish and Indigenous in the 18th century.

Cast
 Diogo Infante as Diogo de Castro e Albuquerque 
 Floriano Peixoto as Captain Pedro
 Luciana Rigueira as Ánote
 Leonardo Villar as Commander
 Buza Ferraz as Antônio
 Murilo Grossi as Alfonso
 Sérgio Mamberti as priest

Production
In the late 1980s, Murat knew the history about the conflict between Indigenous people and military in the Forte Coimbra, a fort of the Western Military Command in the Pantanal of Mato Grosso do Sul. And, in 1997, when a producer asked her about the planning of any film she remembered the story. She first visited the Kadiweu people in April 1997, and the shooting took place in seven weeks in a set in Bonito, Mato Grosso do Sul in 1999.

Reception
It was first screened at the 2000 Toronto International Film Festival and O Estado de S. Paulo reported it received praise from critics. However, Derek Elley from Variety criticized it for its clichés, calling it "solidly conventional behind its verismo front". Elley said "Budgetary constraints hamper what little drama is happening onscreen, and only actor to make much of an impression is Leonardo Villar as the fort's gnarled, pragmatic commander." In spite of it, the film won Best Actress Award (Rigueira) and Best Score Award at the Festival de Brasília.

References

External links

2000 drama films
2000 films
Brazilian drama films
Films directed by Lúcia Murat
Films set in Brazil
Films set in the 18th century
Indigenous cinema in Latin America
2000s Portuguese-language films